Sprague-Thomson is the name of the first rolling stock on the Paris Métro made completely of metal. It replaced the mostly wooden M1.

History

Research before 1908

In light of the Paris Métro train fire of 1903, the Compagnie du chemin de fer métropolitain de Paris (CMP) searched for rolling stock that was both durable and safe.  The Thomson Multiple stock was the most widely adopted at the time, but was complex.  At the same time, the American Sprague stock did not fit the requirements.

Two motors
The Sprague-Thomson was conceived in 1908 through the synthesis of earlier systems and the use of the method of motor control invented by Frank J. Sprague.  Beginning in 1907, the CMP started to construct metallic stock. The motrices 500 (motor cars) formed the first series of Sprague-Thomson, which was referred to familiarly as simply "Sprague". The cars were constructed entirely of metal and each power car had two 175 hp motors. Each train set consisted of five cars, including three power cars, and contained a large compartment of electrical equipment, referred to as a grande loge. After World War I, the motor cars were improved so that the electrical equipment did not take up so much space and thus were called petites loges.

Certain grande loge motor cars were regrouped into sets of two in order to form work trains with two compartments.  These were first painted gray, but later repainted yellow. The arrival of the TMA material in the 1980s and the TME material in the 2000s allowed many of these motor cars to be retired. A project to convert some MF 67 cars for running between depots is in progress to replace the Sprague trains that are currently dedicated to this task. The use of the last Sprague sets ended on 8 March 2011 for health and safety reasons. The T.74, T.91 and T.94 models are preserved by the ADEMAS association, and the T.95 model is preserved by the RATP.

"Nord-Sud" motorcars
The Compagnie du Nord-Sud began construction in 1910 of a new type of Sprague, with four 125 hp motors, and two power cars per train instead of three power cars.  They are painted gray and blue, unlike the dark green of those of the CMP, and red and yellow for first class.  The Nord-Sud also used to have mixed first/second class trailers, which ran on the former line B (St Lazarre - Porte de Saint Ouen / Porte de Clichy).

Power cars with four motors
The color (dark green, light green, and bluish gray) has varied over time, as well as the number of doors (from three to four). The first class cars are red on the CMP network, and yellow on the Nord-Sud. Some cars are colored half green and half red. The classic electric multiple unit trainset contains two power cars, each with four motors, powering three trailer cars with the middle one being first class. Power cars with four motors were built until 1936, some being older models reconstructed but practically identical to the new ones.

Decline
In 1956, the transformation of lines to allow the running of bogies with tyres on line 11 resulted in the retirement of many Sprague trains, many of which were turned into maintenance trains.  The same changes occurred on line 1 in 1963 and line 4 in 1967.

End of the model
The introduction of the MF 67 rolling stock on line 3 in 1968 accelerated the replacement of the Sprague.  The MF 67 stock was first introduced on line 7 and then on many other lines.  In 1975, lines Paris Métro Line 2, 3bis, 5, 7bis and 12 were serviced entirely by Sprague trains and lines 8, 9, and 10 were serviced partially by those trains.  The last two-motor power cars were removed from 2 in 1976.  Those on the Nord-Sud had been eliminated by 1972.

The arrival of the MF 77 accelerated the removal of Sprague trains which by that time were found only on line 9.  By 1982 they had virtually been entirely retired, but the flooding of the station Église de Pantin put a number of MF 67 trains out of service.  As a result, line 5 borrowed stock from line 9, and the Sprague was active again.  The last four Sprague trains of line 9 stopped service on April 16, 1983, with some festivities, after 75 years of service. The last trains in service were yellow; however, it is possible that certain trains from 1908 to 1910 had run for 65 years.

Since 11 May 2010, the RATP has prohibited Sprague stock from passenger service. This prohibition does not affect train set A.475, which specially modified to allow it to run, for example, on European Heritage days.

Legacy
The RATP has preserved three Sprague train sets, only one of which is currently usable by passengers.  From time to time it is exhibited on certain lines and by organisations such as ADEMAS or COPEF, or used in movies, e.g. in Les Femmes de l'ombre. A number of cars are in museums, and those serving as maintenance trains are approaching the age of 100.

Five cars (of which two are 2nd class, with their power car, and one is 1st class, with a trailer) were classified as historical monuments on December 18, 1998.  Another car, a second class power car, is preserved at the Vaugirard depot and was 'classified' on 17 February 2000.

References

Paris Métro rolling stock
Articles containing video clips